Sarıyayla is a village in the Nazımiye District, Tunceli Province, Turkey. The village is populated by Kurds of the Hormek tribe and had a population of 129 in 2021.

The hamlets of Bahtiyar, Balık, Kemik, Kılıçlar, Kuzguncuk, Tutuklu and Yaylacık are attached to the village.

References 

Villages in Nazımiye District
Kurdish settlements in Tunceli Province